Nathan Michel is an American experimental electronic musician. He primarily composes and performs his music on a laptop. He has released albums on labels such as Tigerbeat6, SKI-PP and Sonig and has collaborated with well-known laptop group DAT politics. Michel has received numerous awards for his work including a Morton Gould Young Composer Award from ASCAP and a Charles Ives Scholarship from the American Academy of Arts and Letters. He received his PhD in music composition from Princeton University in 2007.

Michel and his wife, Amber Papini, constitute two-thirds of the pop band Hospitality.

Releases
 ABC DEF 2002
 Dear Bicycle 2003
 Trebly 2003
 Alphabet Series C 2004
 The Beast 2005

External links
Official Web site

American electronic musicians
Living people
Pupils of Louis Andriessen
Yale School of Music alumni
Princeton University alumni
Year of birth missing (living people)